Richard Seymour Cawthorne (born 3 December 1976) is an Australian actor of theatre, film and television.

Career

Cawthorne has appeared in many film and television productions. His credits include Catching Milat, Fat Tony & Co, Bikie Wars: Brothers in Arms, The Straits, East West 101, Rush, Noise, Neighbours, Underbelly: Squizzy, Wolf Creek and Killing Time, for which he won the 2012 Australian Academy of Cinema and Television Arts (AACTA). Award for Best Supporting Actor in a Television Drama. In 2015, Richard was appointed Ambassador to the National Theatre in Melbourne.

Personal life
Cawthorne was born in Hong Kong in 1976, the youngest of two. His mother, Zelda, was a journalist for the South China Morning Post, and his father, Russell, was a Marketing Executive for the Hong Kong-based film company, Golden Harvest Studios.

Cawthorne is a first cousin of Australian Labor Minister Martin Pakula.

Filmography

Film

Television

Awards and nominations

References

External links
 

1976 births
AACTA Award winners
Australian male film actors
Australian male television actors
Hong Kong people
Australian Jews
Jewish Australian male actors
Living people